Richard Jarvis may refer to:

Richard Jarvis (businessman) (1829–1903), American businessman and industrialist from Connecticut
Richard Jarvis (politician) (born 1950), American politician from Idaho
 Richard Jarvis (American football) (born 1995), American football linebacker